Canoeing at the 2010 Asian Games was held in Guangzhou, China from November 13 to 26, 2010. Men's and women's competition were held in Kayak and men's competition in Canoe with all events having taken place at the International Rowing Centre.

Schedule

Medalists

Slalom

Men

Women

Sprint

Men

Women

Medal table

Participating nations
A total of 178 athletes from 20 nations competed in canoeing at the 2010 Asian Games:

References

External links
Canoeing Slalom Site of 2010 Asian Games
Canoeing Sprint Site of 2010 Asian Games

 
2010 Asian Games events
Asian Games
2010